The 1960 Dutch TT was the third round of the 1960 Grand Prix motorcycle racing season. It took place on 25 June 1960 at the Circuit van Drenthe, Assen.

500 cc classification

350 cc classification

250 cc classification

125 cc classification

Sidecar classification

References

Dutch TT
Dutch
Tourist Trophy